Monster Movie is the debut studio album by German rock band Can, released in August 1969 by Music Factory and Liberty Records.

Background and recording 

In 1968 Can had produced an album entitled Prepared to Meet Thy PNOOM, which no record company agreed to release (recordings were eventually released on LP in 1981 as part of Delay 1968). Monster Movie was Can's attempt at a more accessible record. The album is credited to "The Can", a name suggested by vocalist Malcolm Mooney and adopted by democratic vote. Previously the band had been known as "Inner Space", which later became the name of their purpose-built recording studio. Some copies of the LP bore the subtitle "Made in a castle with better equipment",  referring to Schloss Nörvenich, the 14th-century castle in North Rhine-Westphalia where the band recorded from 1968-69.

The image on the cover is a retrace of Galactus, as originally depicted by Jack Kirby (inked by Vince Colletta) in Marvel's Thor #134 - page 3, released in 1966.

Content 
Monster Movie brings together elements of psychedelic rock, blues, free jazz, world music and other styles, the influence of the Velvet Underground being particularly obvious on the opening track "Father Cannot Yell". The use of improvisation, experimentation, editing and layering of sounds set a standard for Can's subsequent albums in the early 1970s, which were seminal to the freewheeling avant-garde style dubbed "krautrock" by the British music press. The 20-minute jam "Yoo Doo Right" was pared down from 6 hours' taping, while the lyrics of "Mary, Mary So Contrary" riff off "Mary, Mary, Quite Contrary", a popular English nursery rhyme.

Monster Movie was the last Can album on which Malcolm Mooney performed all of the vocals until Rite Time, recorded in late 1986 and issued in 1989.

Track listing

Personnel 
Can
 Irmin Schmidt – keyboards
 Jaki Liebezeit – drums
 Holger Czukay – bass
 Michael Karoli – guitar
 Malcolm Mooney – vocals, harmonica

References

Works cited

1969 debut albums
Can (band) albums
United Artists Records albums